Azochis is a genus of moths of the family Crambidae. The genus was erected by Francis Walker in 1859.

Species
Azochis camptozonalis Hampson, 1913
Azochis cirrhigeralis Dognin, 1908
Azochis curvilinealis Schaus, 1912
Azochis cymographalis Hampson, 1918
Azochis ectangulalis (Hampson, 1913)
Azochis essequibalis Schaus, 1924
Azochis euvexalis (Möschler, 1890)
Azochis gripusalis Walker, 1859
Azochis mactalis (C. Felder, R. Felder & Rogenhofer, 1875)
Azochis oncalis Schaus, 1912
Azochis patronalis (Möschler, 1882)
Azochis pieralis (Walker, 1859)
Azochis rufidiscalis Hampson, 1904
Azochis rufifrontalis (Hampson, 1895)
Azochis ruscialis (Druce, 1895)
Azochis trichotarsalis Hampson, 1918

References

Spilomelinae
Crambidae genera
Taxa named by Francis Walker (entomologist)